The 2020 Arizona Tennis Classic was a professional tennis tournament played on hard courts. It would be the second edition of the tournament which was part of the 2020 ATP Challenger Tour. It was scheduled to take place in Phoenix, Arizona, United States between 16 and 22 March 2020. The tournament was canceled due to the COVID-19 pandemic.

References

2020 ATP Challenger Tour
Sports competitions in Phoenix, Arizona
2020 in American tennis
March 2020 sports events in the United States
Tennis events cancelled due to the COVID-19 pandemic